Antarctic Haven is a bay in King Christian X Land, Northeastern Greenland.

Administratively it lies in the Northeast Greenland National Park area.

History
This natural harbour was named "Antarctics Hamn" by Swedish Arctic explorer Alfred Gabriel Nathorst after his ship Antarctic, which anchored there on 20 August 1899 during the Swedish Greenland Expedition in search of survivors of S. A. Andrée's Arctic balloon expedition of 1897.

J. K. Tornøe advanced the hypothesis that this bay might correspond to the ‘Finnsbúdir’ of the Sagas of Icelanders. 

In the southern corner of the head of the bay there is a Norwegian hunting hut that originally had been known as "Karlsbak Station". It was built by Jonas Karlsbak and Odd Åmbak in 1930. The hut had a meteorological facility and Karlsbak/LMU was its radio station. The station was active in 1930–38 and again in 1946–59. 

Close to the building there is a memorial to Norwegian explorer Helge Ingstad (1899 – 2001), who was using the Antarctic Haven hut as his residence when he wintered there as the Governor of Erik the Red's Land in the winter of 1932–33. Nowadays the name "Karlsbak" is used for a mountain to the east of the bay.

The historical Norwegian Antarctic Haven Station was restored in the summer 2001 by the Nanok East Greenland Fishing Company. It was destroyed in 2002 by an avalanche.

Geography
This northeast-facing bay is located in NE Scoresby Land, at the southern end of the King Oscar Fjord, in the Davy Sound area. It is one of the small branches of the King Oscar Fjord system. There are drying flats at the head of the bay. 

The bay is mostly surrounded by high mountains. The Pictet Range is located to the west of the bay and Karlsbak to the southeast.

Bibliography
Spencer Apollonio, Lands That Hold One Spellbound: A Story of East Greenland, 2008

See also
List of fjords of Greenland
Jónsbú Station
Myggbukta

References

External links

Antarctic Havn

Bays of Greenland
Ruins in Greenland
1932 establishments in Norway
History of Greenland